Buena Vista Colored School is a historic school building for African American children located at Buena Vista, Virginia. It was built in 1914, and expanded in 1926.  It is a one-story, brick structure with a hipped, sheet metal roof.  Also on the property is a contributing brick outbuilding once used to store wood and coal.  The building served as the only local school for African American children in grades 1–7 from 1914 to 1957. The Buena Vista Colored School Historical Society was organized in 2002 to restore the school as a museum and community center.

It was listed on the National Register of Historic Places in 2003.

See also 
 Buena Vista Colored School Historical Society http://buenavistacoloredschool.com/index.html

References

African-American history of Virginia
School buildings on the National Register of Historic Places in Virginia
School buildings completed in 1926
Buildings and structures in Buena Vista, Virginia
National Register of Historic Places in Buena Vista, Virginia
1926 establishments in Virginia